Khargushi (also Romanized as Khargūshī; also known as Khargūshī Hezār) is a village in Harirud Rural District, Bujgan District, Torbat-e Jam County, Razavi Khorasan Province, Iran. At the 2006 census, its population was 571, in 127 families.

References 

Populated places in Torbat-e Jam County